Agononida sabatesae is a species of squat lobster in the family Munididae. The species name is dedicated to A. Sabates. There are no common names for Agononida sabatesae.

References

Squat lobsters
Crustaceans described in 1994